The Best of the Girl Groups is a 2-volume compilation series released by Rhino Records in 1990. The collection, compiling 36 of the better known tracks by girl groups of the 1960s, is listed at #421 in Rolling Stones list of "Greatest Albums of All Time". Music journalist Robert Christgau includes the compilation in his "core collection" for an essential rock library of music preceding 1980. Entertainment Weekly described the first volume as "a veritable catalog of the era's romantic attitudes".
The New York Times recommends both volumes, in conjunction with Rhino's Girl Group Greats, for listeners seeking "the biggest girl-group hits".

Song selection 
The compilation collects a broad range of the era's well-known hits, featuring seven #1 hit singles  and an additional 14 top ten hits among its 36 tracks, but it includes lesser-known material as well, enough—according to AllMusic—to "keep the collection interesting for more serious fans of girl group pop". The collection includes two representative tracks of Ellie Greenwich, a prolific charting songwriter whose own material both solo and with The Raindrops was often overlooked. The included solo single "You Don't Know" was described by journalist Alan Betrock in his book Girl Groups: The Story of a Sound as "the kind of record that not only transcends and expands the boundaries that come to mind when someone says, 'Girl-group record,' but...also can stand alone, totally unique and unmatched by any other competition". "I Can't Let Go", a 1965 song by Evie Sands which did not chart, was critically described as "superb" though the song failed to capture popular interest until covered by The Hollies a year later. "The One You Can't Have" is one of several "outstanding" singles by popular backing vocalists The Honeys that failed to achieve commercial success. Cher's brush with the girl group genre is also represented, by the 1965 "Dream Baby", a "girl group classic" if not a charting single.

Track listing

The Best of the Girl Groups, Volume 1

The Best of the Girl Groups, Volume 2

Personnel

Performance 

 The Ad Libs – performer
 Hugh Harris
 Danny Austin
 Norman Donegan
 Mary Ann Thomas
 Dave Watt
 Michael Powers
 The Angels – performer
 Barb Allbut
 Phyllis "Jiggs" Allbut
 Peggy Santiglia
 Linda Jansen
 The Caravelles – performer
 Andrea Simpson
 Lois Wilkinson
 Cher – performer
 The Chiffons – performer
 Patricia Bennett
 Judy Craig
 Barbara Lee Jones
 Sylvia Peterson
 Claudine Clark – performer
 The Cookies – performer
 Margie Hendrix
 Dorothy Jones
 Ethel "Earl-Jean" McCrea
 Patricia Lyles
 Margaret Ross
 Skeeter Davis – performer
 The Dixie Cups – performer
 Barbara Anne Hawkins
 Rosa Lee Hawkins
 Joan Marie Johnson
 Dale Mickle
 The Essex – performer
 Rodney Taylor
 Rudolph Johnson
 Anita Humes
 Walter Vickers
 Billy Hill
 Betty Everett – performer
 The Exciters – performer
 Carol Johnson
 Skip McPhee
 Ronnie Pace
 Brenda Reid
 Lillian Walker
 Sylvia Wilbur
 Herb Rooney
 Ellie Greenwich – performer
 The Honeys – performer
 Ginger Blake
 Diane Rovell
 Marilyn Rovell
 Barbara Rovell
 The Jaynetts – performer
 Yvonne Bushnell
 Ethel Davis
 Ada Ray
 Johnnie Louise Richardson
 Mary Sue Wells
 Zelma Sanders
 The Jelly Beans – performer
 Charles Thomas
 Alma Brewer
 Elyse Herbert
 Maxine Herbert
 Diane Taylor
 Carole King – performer
 Little Eva – performer
 The Murmaids – performer
 Carol Fischer
 Terry Fischer
 Sally Gordon
 The Paris Sisters – performer
 Albeth Paris
 Priscilla Paris
 The Raindrops – performer
 Ellie Greenwich
 Jeff Barry
 Evie Sands – performer
 The Shangri-Las – performer
 Marge Ganser
 Mary Anne Ganser
 Betty Weiss
 Mary Weiss
 The Shirelles – performer
 Doris Coley
 Addie Harris
 Beverley Lee
 Shirley Owens
 Joanie Sommers – performer
 The Toys – performer
 June Montiero
 Barbara Parritt
 Barbara Harris
 Robin Ward – performer

Production 
 Sevie Bates – design
 Irwin Chusid – liner notes
 Geoff Gans – art direction
 Bill Inglot – producer, transfers, digital preparation
 Michael Ochs – photography
 Ken Perry – transfers, digital preparation
 Gary Stewart – compilation

References 

1990 compilation albums
Rhino Records compilation albums
Pop compilation albums
Soul compilation albums